Garaeus specularis is a moth of the family Geometridae first described by Frederic Moore in 1868. It is found from India to Japan.

The wingspan is 35–40 mm for subspecies specularis and 28–39 mm for subspecies mactans.

Subspecies
Garaeus specularis specularis
Garaeus specularis fenestratus Butler, 1881
Garaeus specularis latior Wehrli, 1940
Garaeus specularis mactans (Butler, 1878) (Japan)

References

Moths described in 1868
Ourapterygini
Moths of Japan